The Yawkyawk is a female creature originating in the mythology of the Kunwinjku people of Western Arnhem Land, Northern Territory, Australia. 

It is also known as ngal-kunburriyaymi.

It is a creature similar to the typical mermaid in appearance, and has seaweed for hair. Seaweed that floats up to the water's surface is said, by Aboriginal people, to come from the head of a Yawkyawk.

While this creature's normal form has the upper body of a humanoid female, and the lower part of a fish, it is also capable of shapeshifting. Among its favoured forms are that of a crocodile, dragonfly, snake or swordfish.

Another power the Yawkyawk was believed to possess includes the ability to manipulate the weather, such as bringing nourishing rain, or sending storms on those who make them angry.

With the abilities these spirits possess, some people claim that they are the daughters and/or female counterparts (and thus wives) of the Rainbow Serpent Creator god, Ngalyod.

References

Australian Aboriginal legendary creatures
Mermaids
Shapeshifting